Rutendo Nyahora (born 11 November 1988) is a Zimbabwean long distance runner who specialises in the marathon. She competed in the women's marathon event at the 2016 Summer Olympics. In 2019, she competed in the women's marathon at the 2019 World Athletics Championships held in Doha, Qatar. She finished in 21st place.

References

External links
 

1988 births
Living people
Zimbabwean female long-distance runners
Zimbabwean female marathon runners
Place of birth missing (living people)
Athletes (track and field) at the 2016 Summer Olympics
Olympic athletes of Zimbabwe